Maglavit is a commune in Dolj County, Oltenia, Romania. It is composed of two villages, Hunia and Maglavit.

History

In mid-1935, local Romanian Orthodox shepherd Petrache Lupu claimed to have seen and spoken with God. Over the following three years, some two million pilgrims came to Maglavit, 10 million lei in donations were raised and King Carol II ordered the construction of a church on the site of the reported miracle. However, interest in the story had withered by autumn 1938, the church remained largely unbuilt and the funds were embezzled. The episode was exploited by the far-right: Iron Guard supporter Nichifor Crainic eulogized Lupu, while his Sfarmă-Piatră was still mentioning him in April 1941. Meanwhile, in 1935, Iron Guard sympathizer N. Crevedia claimed Lupu had cured him of uncontrollable blinking.

Gallery

See also
Maglavit Monastery

References

Communes in Dolj County
Localities in Oltenia
Important Bird Areas of Romania